Zeuxo may refer to:
 Zeuxo (Greek mythology), a Greek Oceanid
 438 Zeuxo, a large Main belt asteroid discovered in 1898
 Zeuxo (crustacean), a genus in family Tanaididae

See also